Derbyshire County Cricket Club in 1884 represents the cricket season when the English club Derbyshire had been playing for thirteen years. They lost all ten county matches and their only victory was against MCC. Partly in response to this the club created as an offshoot the football club Derby County F.C. in 1884.

1884 cricket season

Derbyshire played ten county matches, one against the touring Australians and one against MCC. Ludford Docker was captain for his only season. In a sparse season without any centuries, Frank Sugg was top scorer. William Cropper and Joseph Marlow shared most wickets with 34 each.

The season was marked by the arrival of the two Sugg brothers from Yorkshire - Frank and Walter. Frank moved to Lancashire CCC after three years, but Walter had a long career with Derbyshire. Frank Shacklock played the first of two seasons for the club. Cricket poet Alfred Cochrane made his debut, sharing his appearances with Oxford University over the following years. Joseph Chatterton, younger brother of William, played the first of three seasons. William Shipton played one match but only played for the county again when they were without first class status.  Matthew Burrows played his one career match during the season.

The season saw the retirement of two originals of the first Derbyshire side in 1871 - Robert Smith and John Platts. Platts returned to the sport as an umpire. Two other long-timers also left - Thomas Foster first played in 1873. He was running a pub and later returned to umpire. Henry Shaw had joined in 1875.

Matches

Statistics

First-class batting averages

A number of additional players appeared in the matches against Staffordshire. Apart from William Delacombe and Ralph Docker none of these players appeared in any first class matches for Derbyshire. These players were CC Marshall, Haydn Morley, WB Woodforde, A Jourdain, William Turnley, F C Newton, D Bostock, Johnstone and Giffard.

First-class bowling averages

Wicket keeping
Thomas Mycroft Catches 23 Stumping 8

Derby County Football Club
Derby County F.C. was formed in 1884 as an offshoot of the cricket club in an attempt to give players and supporters  a winter interest as well as secure the cricket club extra revenue. The original intention was to name the club "Derbyshire County F.C." to highlight the link, though the Derbyshire FA, formed in 1883, objected on the grounds it was too long and therefore would not have been understood by the fans. Playing their home matches at the cricket club's Racecourse Ground, 1884/85 saw the club undertake an extensive programme of friendly matches, the first of which was a 6–0 defeat to Great Lever on 13 September 1884. The club's first competitive match came in the 1885 FA Cup, where they lost 7–0 at home to Walsall Town.

See also
Derbyshire County Cricket Club seasons
1884 English cricket season
Imperfect season

References

1884 in English cricket
Derbyshire County Cricket Club seasons
English cricket seasons in the 19th century